Commodore Douglas Mortimer Lewes Neame DSO Bar (9 October 1901 – 13 June 1988) was an English track and field athlete who competed for Great Britain in the 1928 Summer Olympics.

He was born in Hanover Square and died in Salisbury.

In 1928 he was eliminated in the first round of the 110 metre hurdles event.

At the 1930 Empire Games he won the bronze medal in the 440 yards hurdles competition.

He carried the Olympic Torch across the English Channel for the 1948 Olympic Games.

References
sports-reference.com

1901 births
1988 deaths
Athletes from London
People from the City of Westminster
English male hurdlers
Olympic athletes of Great Britain
Athletes (track and field) at the 1928 Summer Olympics
Commonwealth Games bronze medallists for England
Commonwealth Games medallists in athletics
Athletes (track and field) at the 1930 British Empire Games
Medallists at the 1930 British Empire Games